The National Association of Intercollegiate Athletics has 250 member colleges and universities for athletic competition in the 2022–23 season.

NAIA institutions

Note: Non-basketball playing institutions are denoted by *.

See also

List of NCAA Division I institutions
List of NCAA Division II institutions
List of NCAA Division III institutions
List of USCAA institutions
List of NCCAA institutions
List of NJCAA Division I schools
List of NJCAA Division II schools
List of NJCAA Division III schools
List of NAIA football programs
NAIA lacrosse

References

Institutions

NAIA Institutions